The 2018 Thai League 1 is the 22nd season of the Thai League 1, the top Thai professional league for association football clubs, since its establishment in 1996, also known as Toyota Thai League due to the sponsorship deal with Toyota Motor Thailand. A total of 18 teams will compete in the league. The season began on 9 February 2018 and is scheduled to conclude on 7 October 2018.

Buriram United are the defending champions, while Chainat Hornbill, Air Force Central and Prachuap have entered as the promoted teams from the 2017 Thai League 2.

The 1st transfer window is from 14 November 2017 to 5 February 2018 while the 2nd transfer window is from 1 June 2018 to 29 June 2018.

Changes from last season

Team changes

Promoted clubs
Promoted from the 2017 Thai League 2
 Chainat Hornbill
 Air Force Central
 Prachuap

Relegated clubs

Relegated from the 2017 Thai League
 Thai Honda Ladkrabang
 Sisaket
 Super Power Samut Prakan

Renamed clubs
 Super Power Samut Prakan authorize from Jumpasri United
 Prachuap was renamed to PT Prachuap

Teams

Stadium and locations
Note: Table lists in alphabetical order.

Notes
Bangkok United used the Rajamangala National Stadium for their round 8 tie against Chiangrai United

Personnel and sponsoring
Note: Flags indicate national team as has been defined under FIFA eligibility rules. Players may hold more than one non-FIFA nationality.

Notes
Gilberto Macena is the official captain of Chiangrai United, but due to his season long injury, Victor Cardozo and Atit Daosawang filled in as captain for Chiangrai United.

Managerial changes

Foreign players

A T1 team could registered five foreign players by at least one player from AFC member countries and at least one player from ASEAN member countries. A team can use four foreign players on the field in each game, including at least one player from the AFC member countries or ASEAN member countries (3+1).
Note :: players who released during summer transfer window;: players who registered during summer transfer window;↔: players who have dual nationality by half-caste or naturalization.→: players who left club after registered during first or second leg.

League table

Standings

Positions by round

Results by match played

Results

Season statistics

Top scorers
As of 7 October 2018.

Top assists
As of 7 October 2018.

Hat-tricks

Clean sheets
As of 7 October 2018.

Awards

Monthly awards

Attendance

Overall statistics

Attendance by home match played

Source: Thai League

See also
 2018 Thai League 2
 2018 Thai League 3
 2018 Thai League 4
 2018 Thailand Amateur League
 2018 Thai FA Cup
 2018 Thai League Cup
 2018 Thailand Champions Cup
 Thai League All-Star Football
 List of foreign Thai League 1 players

References

2018
2018 in Asian association football leagues
2018 in Thai football leagues